A bullroarer is a ritual sound instrument and an ancient communication device used for communicating over greatly extended distances.
Bullroarer may also refer to:

"Bullroarer", a song on Midnight Oil's 1987 album Diesel and Dust
 Bullroarer, the nickname of the great-great-grand-uncle of  Bilbo Baggins.